Heather Hiscox (born 18 November 1965) is a Canadian news anchor who hosts CBC News Now from 6 to 10 a.m. on weekdays on CBC News Network. She was also the host of the CBC's former flagship morning television program CBC News: Morning which became part of CBC News Now when the network re-branded itself in 2009.

Biography
Hiscox was born in Owen Sound, Ontario and grew up in a medical family. She graduated in 1986 from the University of Toronto, with a B.A. in French language and literature and from the University of Western Ontario in 1987 with a master's degree in journalism. She has previously worked for CFPL-TV, CBC Montreal, the Global Television Network, ASN and CHCH in Hamilton, Ontario, before returning to the CBC at the network level. She also co-hosted a morning show on 1290 CJBK in London, Ontario with Steve Garrison from 1990–1991. In 1988–89 she did a variety of radio shifts at London's Rock FM96 CFPL-FM including afternoon drive and evenings. She began her broadcasting career in her hometown of Owen Sound at radio station CFOS/CFPS. In 1997, she appeared on the CIQC AM 600 Montreal program Travel World as part of a feature headlined as "The Hidden Holiday Hide-away Haunts of Heather Hiscox".

Hiscox won the Miss Teen Canada pageant in 1981 when she was 16 years old. She is married to a heart surgeon, Martin Goldbach.

References

External links
 CBC News Morning: Heather Hiscox, profile
 CBC News Now with Heather Hiscox, her titular program
 
 digitaljournal.com
 pageantopolis.com
 lfpress.com

1965 births
Canadian television news anchors
Living people
People from Owen Sound
University of Toronto alumni
University of Western Ontario alumni
CBC Television people
Canadian women television journalists
Canadian beauty pageant winners
20th-century Canadian journalists
21st-century Canadian journalists
20th-century Canadian women
Canadian Screen Award winning journalists